Sena/Quina, la inmortalidad del cangrejo is a film written and directed by Paolo Agazzi.

Synopsis
The story of two minor con artists, who survive by deceiving others with small and ingenious scams. Their lives take an unexpected turn when attempting to deceive another victim who turns out to be more cunning than they are.

Cast
Cristian Mercado as Falso Conejo
Rosendo Paz as Miami Vaca
José Véliz as Justo Pascual
Soledad Ardaya as Alondra

References

External links

Official Website

2005 films
Bolivian comedy films
2005 comedy films
Films directed by Paolo Agazzi